Gerry Byrne, PC MHA (born September 27, 1966) is a Canadian politician who was a Liberal Member of Parliament from 1996 to 2015 representing  Humber—St. Barbe—Baie Verte, Newfoundland and Labrador, and a cabinet minister in the government of Jean Chrétien. Since the 2015 provincial election, he has served as MHA for  Corner Brook. Byrne served in provincial cabinet during the Ball government and is currently Minister of Immigration, Skills and Labour in the Furey government.

Education
Byrne received a Bachelor of Science in environmental science from Dalhousie University.

Federal politics
Byrne has been a Member of Parliament since 1996 when he won a by-election in the province of Newfoundland and Labrador to succeed Brian Tobin. Tobin resigned to run in the 1996 Newfoundland provincial election for Premier. He was re-elected in the 1997, 2000, 2004, 2006, 2008, and 2011 elections. In the 2006 election he had one of the highest margins of victory in Atlantic Canada. Byrne did not stand in the 2015 election and retired from parliament.

In 2005, Byrne voted against Bill C-38 allowing same-sex marriage.

In the Liberal Party's 2006 leadership election, Byrne started out supporting Maurizio Bevilacqua, after Bevilacqua drop out he supported Michael Ignatieff. Ignatieff placed second in the race to winner Stéphane Dion. Ignatieff became Leader of the Liberal Party two years later, and was again supported by Byrne.

In the Liberal Party's 2013 leadership election, Byrne supported Montreal MP Justin Trudeau.

Cabinet minister
He was Minister of State for the Atlantic Canada Opportunities Agency from 2002 to 2003. When Paul Martin became Prime Minister in 2003, Byrne was not assigned back to his former Cabinet post and was succeeded by Joe McGuire.

Comments on PETA pie incident
On January 25, 2010, Fisheries Minister, Gail Shea was pied while giving a speech at the Canada Centre for Inland Waters. An American PETA activist, Emily McCoy, was later arrested in Burlington, charged with assault in connection with the incident. PETA has taken public responsibility for the incident, saying that it was part of a broader campaign against the Canadian Government's support of the seal hunt.

In response to the pieing of the Fisheries Minister, Byrne denounced the attack on the minister as an act of terrorism. He commented on the 26th, "When someone actually coaches or conducts criminal behaviour to impose a political agenda on each and every other citizen of Canada, that does seem to me to meet the test of a terrorist organization." Byrne continued to say, "I am calling on the Government of Canada to actually investigate whether or not this organization, PETA, is acting as a terrorist organization under the test that exists under Canadian law." In response to his interpretation of Canadian law, PETA president Ingrid Newkirk said Byrne's reaction was "a silly, chest-beating exercise."

Provincial politics
In the provincial Liberal Party's 2013 leadership race, Byrne supported Humber Valley MHA Dwight Ball. Byrne retired from federal politics at the 2015 election in order to run successfully provincially later that year becoming MHA for Corner Brook. Following the Ball Liberals forming government in the 2015 election, he was appointed Minister of Advanced Education, Skills and Labour. He subsequently served as Minister of Fisheries and Land Resources following a 2017 cabinet shuffle.
Byrne was re-elected in the 2019 provincial election.

On August 19, 2020, he was appointed Minister of Immigration, Skills and Labour in the Furey government.

Byrne was re-elected in the 2021 provincial election.

Electoral record

Provincial

Federal

References

External links
Gerry Byrne's Webpage

1966 births
Living people
People from Corner Brook
Members of the 26th Canadian Ministry
Members of the House of Commons of Canada from Newfoundland and Labrador
Liberal Party of Canada MPs
Dalhousie University alumni
Liberal Party of Newfoundland and Labrador MHAs
Members of the Executive Council of Newfoundland and Labrador